I Know Places may refer to:

"I Know Places", a song by Lykke Li from the album Wounded Rhymes, 2011
"I Know Places", a song by Taylor Swift from the album 1989, 2014